Thomas J. Culhane (August 16, 1928 – September 2, 2015) was an American politician who served in the New York State Assembly from the 82nd district from 1973 to 1977.

He died on September 2, 2015, in Brooklyn, New York City, New York at age 87.

References

1928 births
2015 deaths
Democratic Party members of the New York State Assembly